Florida cracker architecture is a style of vernacular architecture typified by a wood-frame house. It was widespread in the 19th century and is still popular with some developers as a source of design themes.

Florida cracker refers to colonial-era English pioneer settlers and their descendants. There was no air conditioning, and the new immigrants to the Sunshine State had to depend on nature to get some relief from the heat. Houses of this style are characterized by metal roofs, raised floors, and straight central hallways from the front to the back of the home (sometimes called "dog trot" or "shotgun" hallways, similar to the shotgun house design). They built their homes surrounded by wide verandas or porches, often wrapping around the entire home, to provide shade for their windows and walls. Some houses had a clerestory that would improve the ventilation in the interior.

Examples

Big Bend Farm Buildings at the Tallahassee Museum in Tallahassee, Florida
Cracker Homestead at the Forest Capital Museum State Park in Perry, Florida
Bensen House in Grant, Florida
Plumb House in Clearwater, Florida
Winchester Symphony House in Eau Gallie, Florida
Laura (Riding) Jackson Historic House  in Vero Beach, Florida

See also
 Architecture of the United States
 Cracker Gothic

References

External links

 
 
 
Cracker Houses

American architectural styles
Florida cracker culture
Vernacular architecture in Florida